The 2011 Pacific Rugby Cup was the sixth edition of the Pacific Rugby Cup competition.  The tournament featured national 'A' teams from the three Pacific rugby unions as well as Super Rugby development teams from Australia and New Zealand.

Teams

The three core teams:
 Fiji Warriors 

 

Australian opposition:
 Brumby Runners
 Junior Waratahs
 QAS Reds Academy  
	
New Zealand opposition:
 Chiefs Development 
 Crusaders Knights 
 Hurricanes Development

Table

Core Teams
{| class="wikitable"
|-
!width=165|Team
!width=40|Played
!width=40|Won
!width=40|Drawn
!width=40|Lost
!width=40|For
!width=40|Against
!width=40|Diff
!width=40|BP1
!width=40|BP2
!width=40|Pts
|-  style="background:#cfc; text-align:center;"
|align=left| Fiji Warriors       || 8 || 4 || 0 || 4 || 144 || 201 || -57 || 0 || 1 || 17
|- style="text-align:center;"
|align=left|   || 8 || 3 || 0 || 5 || 135 || 171 || -36 || 1 || 2 || 15
|- style="text-align:center;"
|align=left|   || 8 || 2 || 1 || 5 || 133 || 233 ||-100 || 0 || 1 || 11

|- bgcolor="#ffffff" align=center
|colspan="15"|Updated: 26 March 2011Source: oceaniarugby.com
|}
{| class="wikitable collapsible collapsed" style="text-align:center; line-height:100%; font-size:100%; width:60%;"
|-
! colspan="4" style="border:0px" |Competition rules
|-
| colspan="4" | Points breakdown:4 points for a win2 points for a draw1 bonus point for a loss by seven points or less1 bonus point for scoring four or more tries in a match
Classification:Teams standings are calculated as follows:Most log points accumulated from all matchesMost log points accumulated in matches between tied teamsHighest difference between points scored for and against accumulated from all matchesMost points scored accumulated from all matches
|}

New Zealand conference

Source: oceaniarugby.com

Australian conference

Source: oceaniarugby.com

Matches

Round 1

Round 2

Round 3

Round 4

Round 5

Round 6

Round 7

Round 8

Round 9

References

External links
FORU website 

World Rugby Pacific Challenge
2011 rugby union tournaments for national teams
Pacific Rugby Cup
Pacific Rugby Cup
Pacific Rugby Cup
Pacific Rugby Cup
Pacific Rugby Cup
Pacific